Atje Keulen-Deelstra (31 December 1938 – 22 February 2013) was a Dutch speed skater, who was a four-time World Allround Champion between the age of 32 and 36.

Biography
Atje Deelstra was born as the eldest of four siblings in a farmer's family. As a teenager she did gymnastics, athletics and basketball, but finally chose speed skating. At the age of 16, she already won a junior title of Friesland and several cash prizes in the Netherlands. In 1962, she married Jelle Keulen (23 November 1931 – 28 July 2011), a farmer with whom she had three children born between 1963 and 1966.

When the Thialf arena opened in 1967 in Heerenveen, Keulen-Deelstra went there to work on a comeback. She quickly made much progress, but she was told over and over again that she was too old. Not a member of the Dutch speed skating team, she won the Dutch Allround Championships in 1970 at the age of 32, beating Dutch skating team members such as Ans Schut and multiple world champion Stien Kaiser. That same year, she became World Allround Champion. More successes soon followed when in 1972, she became Dutch, European, and World Allround Champion, a feat she then repeated the following two years (1973 and 1974). In addition, at the 1972 Winter Olympics in Sapporo, she won one silver and two bronze medals.

In 1975, Keulen-Deelstra switched to marathon skating and she became Dutch Champion in that discipline five times. She won her last Dutch Marathon Championships title in 1980 when she was 42 years old. In 1997, just a few weeks after having been injured in a traffic accident, Keulen-Deelstra participated in the Elfstedentocht. She died of a cerebral infarction in 2013.

In the 1980s and early 1990s, her daughter Boukje Keulen (born 2 December 1963) also was a successful skater. Like her mother, Boukje went from short track through long track ("regular") to marathon speed skating.

Medals
An overview of medals won by Keulen-Deelstra at important championships she participated in, listing the years in which she won each:

Dutch National Kortebaan Speed Skating Championships -  1969, 1976, 1977

World records
Over the course of her career, Keulen-Deelstra skated 2 world records:

References

Notes

Bibliography

 Bijlsma, Hedman with Tom Dekkers; Alex Dumas; Gé du Maine and Karel Verbeek. Schaatsseizoen '72–'73, deel 1: heren. Leusden, the Netherlands, September 1973.
 Bijlsma, Hedman with Tom Dekkers; Alex Dumas; Gé du Maine and Karel Verbeek. Schaatsseizoen '72–'73, deel 2: dames. Leusden, the Netherlands, November 1973.
 Bijlsma, Hedman with Tom Dekkers; Alex Dumas; Gé du Maine; Hans Niezen and Karel Verbeek. Schaatsseizoen '73–'74: Statistische terugblik. Leusden, the Netherlands, November 1974.
 Bijlsma, Hedman with Tom Dekkers; Arie van Erk; Gé du Maine; Hans Niezen; Nol Terwindt and Karel Verbeek. Schaatsseizoen '96–'97: 25e Jaargang 1996–1997, statistische terugblik. Assen, the Netherlands: Stichting Schaatsseizoen, 1997. ISSN 0922-9582.
 Eng, Trond. All Time International Championships, Complete Results: 1889 – 2002. Askim, Norway: WSSSA-Skøytenytt, 2002.
 Fan der Fear, Ypk. Us Atsje (West Frisian). Buitenpost, Friesland, Netherlands: Uitgeverij Alternatyf, 1974.
 Koomen, Theo. 10 Jaar Topschaatsen. Laren(NH), Netherlands: Uitgeverij Luitingh, 1971. .
 Koomen, Theo. Topschaatsen 1972. Laren(NH), Netherlands: Uitgeverij Luitingh, 1972. .
 Koomen, Theo. Topschaatsen 3. Laren(NH), Netherlands: Uitgeverij Luitingh, 1973. .
 Kleine, Jan. Schaatsjaarboek 1968/69, alles over het hardrijden op de lange baan. Amsterdam, Netherlands, Drukkerij Dico, 1968.
 Kleine, Jan. Schaatsjaarboek 1969–'70, alles over het hardrijden op de lange baan. Ede, Netherlands, 1969.
 Kleine, Jan. Schaatsjaarboek 1970–'71, alles over het hardrijden op de lange baan. Nijmegen, Netherlands, Schaatsjaarboek, 1970.
 Kleine, Jan. Schaatsjaarboek 1971–'72, alles over het hardrijden op de lange baan. Nijmegen, Netherlands, Schaatsjaarboek, 1971.
 Kleine, Jan. Schaatsjaarboek 1972–'73, alles over het hardrijden op de lange baan. Nijmegen, Netherlands, Schaatsjaarboek, 1972.
 Maaskant, Piet. Atje Keulen-Deelstra vertelt exclusief haar story. Zwolle, Netherlands: La Rivière & Voorhoeve, 1970. 
 Maaskant, Piet. Heya, Heya! Het nieuwe boek van de Schaatssport. Zwolle, Netherlands: La Rivière & Voorhoeve, 1970.
 Peereboom, Klaas. Van Jaap Eden tot Ard Schenk. Baarn, Netherlands: De Boekerij, 1972. .
 Teigen, Magne. Komplette Resultater Internasjonale Mesterskap 1889 – 1989: Menn/Kvinner, Senior/Junior, allround/sprint. Veggli, Norway: WSSSA-Skøytenytt, 1989. (Noors)
 Van Eyle, Wim. Een Eeuw Nederlandse Schaatssport. Utrecht, Netherlands: Uitgeverij Het Spectrum, 1982. .
 Witkamp, Anton and Koning, Dolf (red.). Schaatsgoud '72. Bussum, Netherlands: Teleboek NV, 1972. .

External links

 Atje Keulen-Deelstra at SpeedSkatingStats.com

1938 births
2013 deaths
Dutch female speed skaters
Speed skaters at the 1972 Winter Olympics
Olympic speed skaters of the Netherlands
Olympic medalists in speed skating
Olympic silver medalists for the Netherlands
Olympic bronze medalists for the Netherlands
World record setters in speed skating
Sportspeople from Friesland
People from Boarnsterhim
Medalists at the 1972 Winter Olympics
World Allround Speed Skating Championships medalists
21st-century Dutch women
20th-century Dutch women